The Ministry of Health and Social Affairs is a ministry in the government of Sweden responsible for policies related to social welfare: financial security, social services, medical and health care, health promotion and the rights of children and disabled people.

The Ministry of Health and Social Affairs employs approximately 200 members of staff.  About 20 of these are political appointees and 180 non-politically appointed officials.  The ministry is headed by the "Minister for Health and Social Affairs", Jakob Forssmed (KD). 

The ministry offices are located at Fredsgatan 8 in central Stockholm.

Government agencies and other bodies 
The Ministry of Health and Social Affairs is principal for 17 government agencies, two state-owned companies (one, Systembolaget, operating a monopoly, and another one, Apoteket, operating as a government-owned, non-monopolistic entity) and two institutes.

Policy areas
 Health care, health, social issues/insurance
 Housing and construction
 Religious communities
 State administration and public procurement

See also 

 Health care in Sweden

References

External links 
 Ministry of Health and Social Affairs, official website 

Health and Social Affairs
Sweden
Sweden
Medical and health organizations based in Sweden